Miss International 2015, the 55th Miss International pageant, was held on November 5, 2015 at the Grand Prince Hotel Takanawa in Tokyo, Japan. Valerie Hernandez of Puerto Rico crowned her successor Edymar Martínez of Venezuela at the end of the event with a new crown created and designed by Mikimoto. The Continental Queens were awarded for the first time in this edition.

The pageant hosted by Tetsuya Bessho on his second consecutive year of Miss International.

Results

Placements

Continental queens

Special awards

Contestants
70 delegates competed in the final night of Miss International 2015.

Notes

Returns
Countries and territories when previously withdraw and return this year:

Last competed in 2009:
 
 
Last competed in 2010:
 
Last competed in 2011:
 
Last competed in 2012:
 
Last competed in 2013:

Designations
  – Isis Stocco was appointed as "Miss International Brazil 2015". She was 3rd runner-up Miss Brasil 2013.
  – Brianna Acosta was appointed as "Miss Hawaii International 2015" by the Miss Hawaii International Organization under Harrison Productions LLC. She was Miss Hawaii USA 2013. Hawaiian representative attends as Miss Hawaii (special region of Miss International). 
  – Jennifer Valle was appointed as "Miss International Honduras 2015" by Senorita Honduras Organization. She was Senorita Honduras 2012.
  – Linda Szunai was appointed as "Miss International Hungary 2015" by Miss International Hungary Organization. She was Miss World Hungary 2011.
  – Jhasmeiry Herrera Evans was appointed as "Miss International Panama 2015" by Olais Padilla, National Director of Miss International Panama. She was 2nd runner-up Miss Panama 2015.
  – Ewa Mielnicka was appointed as "Miss International Poland 2015" by Miss Polski Organization. Up to now Miss International franchise belonged to Miss Polonia whereas Miss Polski used to send Polish delegates to Miss World between 2007 and 2014.
  – Angela Jayatissa was appointed as "Miss International Sri Lanka 2015" by Miss Sri Lanka Organization. She was 2nd runner-up Miss Sri Lanka 2011.

Withdrawals
  – No contest
  – No contest
  – No contest
  – Miss Egypt got postponed, Miss International Egypt will compete in 2018.
  – No contest
  – Due to organization issues. Anis Christine Pitty Yaya withdrew from Miss International.
  – No contest
  – No contest
  – Due to personal reasons, Saida Jerónimo did not complete.
  – No contest
  – Due to lack of sponsorship.
  – Due to lack of sponsorship.

References

External links
 Official Miss International website

2015
International
Beauty pageants in Japan
2015 in Tokyo